François Dumont (7 January 1751 – 27 August 1831) was a French painter of portrait miniatures.

Dumont was born at Lunéville (Meurthe), and was left an orphan when young, with five brothers and sisters to support. He was for a while a student under Jean Girardet, and then, on. the advice of a Lunville Academician, Madame Coster, set up a studio for himself. In 1784 he journeyed to Rome, returning after four years careful study, and in 1788 was accepted as an Academician and granted an apartment in the Louvre. He married Marie-Nicole, the daughter of Antoine Vestier, the miniature painter, and had two sons, Aristide and Bias, both of whom became painters.

Dumont was one of the three greatest miniature painters of France, painting portraits of Louis XVI, Marie Antoinette, Louis XVIII and Charles X, and of almost all the important persons of his day. His own portrait was engraved both by Francis Audouin and by Jean-Charles Tardieu.

He resided the greater part of his life in Paris, and there he died. A younger brother, Tony Dumont, was also a miniature painter, a pupil of his brother, a frequent exhibitor and the recipient of a medal from the Academy in 1810. Each artist signed with the surname only, and there is some controversy concerning the attribution to each artist of his own work. Tony was an expert violinist and delighted in painting portraits of persons who were playing upon the violin.

Many of Dumont's finest paintings came into the collection of J. P. Morgan, but others are in the Louvre, presented by the heir of Bias Dumont. The work of both painters is distinguished by breadth, precision and a charming scheme of coloring, and the unfinished works of the elder brother are amongst some of the most beautiful miniatures ever produced.

References

Sources

G. C. Williamson, The History of Portrait Miniatures, London, 1904.
Catalogue of the Collection of Miniatures of Mr J. Pierpont Morgan, vol. iv.

1751 births
1831 deaths
People from Lunéville
18th-century French painters
French male painters
19th-century French painters
French portrait painters
Portrait miniaturists
19th-century French male artists
18th-century French male artists